Henggang station is a station of Line 3, Shenzhen Metro. It opened on 28 December 2010. It is located between Shenhui Road and Baokang Road.

Station layout

Exits

References

External links
 Shenzhen Metro Henggang Station (Chinese)
 Shenzhen Metro Henggang Station (English)

Railway stations in Guangdong
Shenzhen Metro stations
Longgang District, Shenzhen
Railway stations in China opened in 2010